The 2016–17 Nedbank Cup is a South African club football (soccer) tournament. The knockout tournament, based on the English FA Cup format, was one of a weak opponent facing a stronger one.

Qualifying round

13 December 2016 (replay)

Magesi 0–4 Jomo Cosmos

Round of 32
6 Mar 2017

Mamelodi Sundowns 2 : 0 Mariveni United

8 Mar 2017

Polokwane City 3 : 1 African All Stars FC

11 Mar 2017

Jomo Cosmos 3 : 0 United Rovers FC

Kwadukuza United 2 : 2 (aet, 4 : 3 pen.) Ajax Cape Town FC

Buya Msuthu 0 : 2 Bloemfontein Celtic

FC Cape Town 0 : 2 Baroka

Free State Stars 2 : 0 Highlands Park

Stellenbosch Univ. 0 : 3 Kaizer Chiefs

12 Mar 2017

Golden Arrows 3 : 1 Maritzburg United

Days 2 : 5 Mbombela United

Acornbush United 1 : 0 Cape Town FC

Eastern Cape Bees 1 : 3 Orlando Pirates

15 Mar 2017

Cape Town All Stars 0 : 2 Bidvest Wits

Platinum Stars FC 3 : 2 AmaZulu FC

FC Royals 1 : 2 Supersport United

Chippa United 1 : 0 Witbank Spurs

Round of 16
4 Apr 2017

Kwadukuza United 0 : 2 Supersport United

Jomo Cosmos 1 : 1 (aet, 5 : 4 pen.) Bidvest Wits

Baroka 0 : 1 (aet) Platinum Stars FC

8 Apr 2017

Chippa United 2 : 0 Polokwane City

Mamelodi Sundowns 0 : 1 Golden Arrows

Free State Stars 1 : 4 Orlando Pirates

9 Apr 2017

Bloemfontein Celtic 2 : 1 Mbombela United

Acornbush United 1 : 2 Kaizer Chiefs

Quarter finals

Semi finals

Final

External links
Nedbank Cup Official Website

Notes and references

2016–17 domestic association football cups
2016–17 in South African soccer
2016-17